Fraser Thomson was the presenter of the now defunct Real Radio Scotland Football Phone In, fielding the calls for Alan Rough and Derek Johnstone.

He is a fan, and former stadium announcer, of St Johnstone FC, and has previously worked for Youth FM, Tay FM, Beat 106.

He is one of the few people to have a degree in Scottish Ethnology from the University of Edinburgh and owns a cat named Scully.
A former presenter of the blimey show on student radio, he once played Parklife 26 times in a row.
Fraser presented breakfast on  XFM Scotland before it was re-branded as Radio X (United Kingdom).

He was the last local presenter of West FM weekdays 10-2 before it was networked from Clyde 1 in 2017.

As of 8 January 2018, Fraser was the presenter of weekday daytimes from 10am - 2pm on Bauer City 2 Scotland replacing veteran presenter Ally Bally who moved to weekends from 10am - 2pm. He left in October 2021 and was replaced by Stuart Webster.

In November 2021, Fraser joined Pure radio presenting the 1-4pm slot.

References

External links 
 Fraser Thomson's Xfm page
 Fraser Thomson's Real Radio Scotland page

Living people
Year of birth missing (living people)